is a Japanese manga artist, best known for the Ninku series which was serialized in Shueisha's Weekly Shōnen Jump manga magazine between 1993 and 1995, and was adapted into an anime series and film. A second manga titled  ran from 2005 to 2011 in the seinen magazine Ultra Jump. His works inspired artists such as Masashi Kishimoto of Naruto fame, who used to copy Kiriyama's drawings in his studying to become a manga artist.

Works

References

External links
 

1968 births
Manga artists from Tokyo
Living people
People from Suginami